Taylor Township is one of fifteen townships in Greene County, Indiana, USA. At the 2010 census, its population was 1,200.

History
The Richland-Plummer Creek Covered Bridge and Scotland Hotel are listed on the National Register of Historic Places.

Geography
The streams of Black Ankle Creek, Bogard Creek, Burcham Branch, Clifty Branch, Dowden Branch, Flyblow Branch and Stone Branch run through this township.

Unincorporated towns
 Doans
 Scotland
(This list is based on USGS data and may include former settlements.)

Adjacent townships
 Richland Township (north)
 Center Township (northeast)
 Jackson Township (east)
 Perry Township, Martin County (south)
 Madison Township, Daviess County (southwest)
 Cass Township (west)
 Washington Township (west)
 Fairplay Township (northwest)

Cemeteries
The township contains four cemeteries: Dowden, Hasler, Smith-Bethel and Taylor Ridge.

Major highways

References
 U.S. Board on Geographic Names (GNIS)
 United States Census Bureau cartographic boundary files

External links
 Indiana Township Association
 United Township Association of Indiana

Townships in Greene County, Indiana
Bloomington metropolitan area, Indiana
Townships in Indiana